Chahar Deh (also Romanized as Chahār Deh) is a village in Salami Rural District, Salami District, Khaf County, Razavi Khorasan Province, Iran. At the 2006 census, its population was 1,292, in 233 families.

References 

Populated places in Khaf County